Ussel may refer to:

France 
 Ussel, Cantal
 Ussel, Corrèze
 Ussel station
 Ussel, Lot
 Ussel-d'Allier, Allier
 Arrondissement of Ussel, Corrèze
 Canton of Ussel, Corrèze
 Ussel, part of Le Brignon, Haute-Loire
 Ussel, part of Vensat, Puy-de-Dôme

Germany 
Ussel (river), of Bavaria

See also
 d'Ussel, a surname